Football 7-a-side has been contested at every Summer Paralympics between 1984 and 2016. At the 1984 Summer Paralympics, two events were held—one for men with wheelchairs and one for men standing. Every Summer Paralympics since then has consisted of only a standing men's team event; women have never competed.

Football 7-a-side was dropped from the 2020 Summer Paralympics; the IPC rejected a bid for it to be reinstated at the 2024 Summer Paralympics, citing insufficient development in the sport among women.

Men's wheelchair medalists

Men's PC medalists

Medal table

Participating nations 
- : denotes nation that did not take part in that year.

X : denotes nation that did not advance into the final rounds.

See also 
Football 5-a-side at the Summer Paralympics
Football at the Summer Olympics

References 

 
Football 7
Football 7
Football at the Summer Paralympics